The Middle Fork Owyhee River is a tributary of the North Fork Owyhee River in Malheur County, Oregon, and Owyhee County, Idaho, in the United States. It forms along Juniper Mountain, south of the Owyhee Mountains in Idaho. From its headwaters, it flows southwest then curves northwest to and beyond the Idaho–Oregon border, then turns north to meet the North Fork at Three Forks, Oregon. The confluence is less than a mile upstream from the North Fork's confluence with the Owyhee River. Below Three Forks, the main stem Owyhee flows  to empty into the Snake River.

Named tributaries of the Middle Fork from source to mouth include Summit Springs Creek, Berry Gulch, and Field Creek, all of which enter from the left. Below that Pole Creek enters from the right.

See also
 List of rivers of Idaho
 List of rivers of Oregon

References

.
Rivers of Idaho
Rivers of Oregon
Rivers of Malheur County, Oregon
Rivers of Owyhee County, Idaho